Caroline Rougaignon-Vernin is a Monégasque pharmacist and politician, who was a member of the National Council from 2013 to 2018.

Career
She achieved a doctorate in pharmacology from the University of Paris in 1995, and is now president of the Monaco Pharmacy Council. In 2013, Rougaignon-Vernin was elected to the National Council, where she served during the 2013–18 parliament. In 2014, Rougaignon-Vernin was the vice-president of the Committee on Social Interests and Miscellaneous Affairs (CISAD), during which time she opposed remote work. From 2016 to 2018, Rougaignon-Vernin was responsible for work and employment in the National Council. That year, she was rapporteur of the ratification of amendment No. 6 to the Franco-Monegasque convention on social security related to remote work. In 2018, she supported creation of a cable car from La Turbie, France to Monaco.

References

Living people
Monegasque pharmacists
Year of birth missing (living people)
Monegasque women in politics
Members of the National Council (Monaco)
University of Paris alumni
21st-century women politicians
Women pharmacists
Women government ministers of Monaco